Nicolas Binder (born 13 January 2002) is an Austrian professional footballer who plays as a striker for Austria Klagenfurt.

Career
Binder is a youth product of Union Mauer, and moved to the academy of Rapid Wien in 2009. On 24 June 2020 he signed a professional contract with Rapid Wien, tying him to the club until 2022. He began his professional career with their reserves in 2019, before debuting for their senior team in a 2–1 Austrian Football Bundesliga win over Wolfsberger AC on 22 August 2022.

On 27 January 2023, Binder signed a contract with Austria Klagenfurt until 30 June 2026.

Personal life
His father, Michael, was also a professional footballer in Austria.

References

External links
 
 OEFB Profile

2002 births
Living people
Footballers from Vienna
Austrian footballers
Austria youth international footballers
SK Rapid Wien players
SK Austria Klagenfurt players
Austrian Football Bundesliga players
2. Liga (Austria) players
Austrian Regionalliga players
Association football forwards